René Ledent (born 8 November 1907, date of death unknown) was a Belgian footballer .

Biography 

He was a striker at Standard de Liège, before World War II. He scored 69 goals in 188 league matches and was Belgian runner-up 1928 with the Rouches.

He played 3 matches for the Diables Rouges. He was selected for the 1934 Italy World Cup, but did not play.

Honours 
 Belgian international from 1928 to 1934 (3 caps)
 First international match: 8 January 1928, Belgium-Austria (1–2)
 Picked for 1934 World Cup in Italy (did not play)
 Belgian runner-up 1928 with Standard de Liège

References

External links 

Belgian footballers
Belgium international footballers
1934 FIFA World Cup players
Standard Liège players
1907 births
Year of death missing
Association football forwards